The 2015 Cape Verdean Football Championship season was the 36th beginner level competition of the first-tier football in Cape Verde.  Its started on 9 May and finished on 11 July.  The tournament was organized by the Cape Verdean Football Federation.  The schedule including its matches were created on Saturday January 10.  CS Mindelense won the eleventh title and became the second club after Sporting Praia to win three in a row.  Neither clubs participated in the CAF Champions League competition in 2016 and in the  2016 CAF Confederation Cup.   This was the second ever and most recent finals competition that two clubs came from the same island as well as the same city.

CS Mindelense was the defending team of the title.  A total of 12 clubs participated in the competition, one from each island league and one who won the last season's title.

The biggest win was Mindelense who scored 6-0 over Sporting Clube from Brava.  In Group A, only one club scored more than ten goals while four clubs in Group B scored more than ten, the top two scored 14 each and the 3rd and 4th place clubs scored 12 each.  Mindelense became the third and recent club to win all five matches in a six club group stage, Derby also done theirs for the second and most recent time.ĵ

The finals had two of its matches ended in a draw with a goal each, this was the first time that happened.  The winner was decided on penalty kicks and Mindelense won 4-3 on penalty kicks, this was the first that ended in a penalty shootout in 21 years, the next occurred in the following season.

Participating clubs

 CS Mindelense, winner of the 2014 Cape Verdean Football Championships
 Académica Operária, winner of the Boa Vista Island League
 Sporting (Brava), winner of the Brava Island League
 Spartak d'Aguadinha, winner of the Fogo Island League
 Académico 83, winner of the Maio Island League
 Académico do Aeroporto, winner of the Sal Island League
 Beira Mar, winner of the Santiago Island League (North)
 FC Boavista, winner of the Santiago Island League (South)
 Paulense Desportivo Clube, winner of the Santo Antão Island League (North)
 Académica do Porto Novo, winner of the Santo Antão Island League (South)
 FC Ultramarina, winner of the São Nicolau Island League
 FC Derby, runner up of the São Vicente Island League

Information about the clubs

Italics indicates a team playing in a stadium in a different town or city.

League standings
Group A

Group B

Results

Final Stages

Semi-finals

Finals

Statistics
Top scorer: Matxona: 6 goals (of FC Boavista)
Least-beaten goalkeeper: Vozinha (of CS Mindelense)
Greatest player: Oceano (of Paulense)
Greatest trainer: Alberto Leite (of CS Mindelense)
Fair Play Award: Académico do Aeroporto
Highest scoring match: Mindelense 6-0 Sporting Brava (May 23)

See also
2014–15 in Cape Verdean football

References

External links

2016 Cape Verdean Football Championships at RSSSF

Cape Verdean Football Championship seasons
1
Cape